Clarence "Tiger" Davis (born September 25, 1942) is an American politician who represented Maryland's 45th legislative district located in northeast Baltimore City in the Maryland House of Delegates.

Background
Davis was born in Georgia, USA, and graduated from the Paul Laurence Dunbar School in Baltimore, Maryland. He then enlisted in U.S. Air Force and served from 1960 to 1964, after which he was accepted at Morgan State College, where he earned a B.A. degree 4 years later. In 1978, he earned a master's degree, also from Morgan. Although he never tried out for any athletic teams while he was at Morgan, members of the Morgan State Bears lacrosse team considered him an honorary member because of his tremendous support for them.

Davis is a member of the Veterans of Foreign Wars, Vietnam Veterans of America, and is a regional co-ordinator for the National Association for Black Veterans. He is a mason and attends the St. Paul's Baptist Church in Baltimore. Davis is married with four children and several grandchildren.

In the legislature

Davis first won election to the Maryland House of Delegates in 1982 and was sworn in the following January. He was assigned to the House Ways and Means committee where he served for 24 years.

Life after politics
Davis was the state president of AARP (formally the American Association of Retired Persons) Maryland from April 2012 to 2018.

References

1942 births
Politicians from Baltimore
African-American state legislators in Maryland
Democratic Party members of the Maryland House of Delegates
Living people
People from Wilkes County, Georgia
Morgan State University alumni
21st-century African-American people
20th-century African-American people